Dobrzyniewo Duże  is a village in Białystok County, Podlaskie Voivodeship, in north-eastern Poland. It is the seat of the gmina (administrative district) called Gmina Dobrzyniewo Duże.

The village has a population of 1,200.

References

Villages in Białystok County